Matthew Malcolm John Bibb, was a Rhodesia and Nyasaland international lawn bowler.

Bowls career
He won a bronze medal in the fours at the 1962 British Empire and Commonwealth Games in Perth with John Milligan, Ronnie Turner and Victor Blyth.

References

Date of birth unknown
Date of death unknown
Zimbabwean male bowls players
Commonwealth Games bronze medallists for Rhodesia and Nyasaland
Bowls players at the 1962 British Empire and Commonwealth Games
Commonwealth Games medallists in lawn bowls
Medallists at the 1962 British Empire and Commonwealth Games